Persiaran Persekutuan is a major highway in Putrajaya, Malaysia. It connects Wetland Interchange of the South Klang Valley Expressway in the north to Persiaran Sultan Salahuddin Abdul Aziz Shah in the south.

Lists of interchanges

Highways in Malaysia
Highways in Putrajaya

References